Michael Grzesiek (born June 2, 1994), better known as Shroud (formerly mEclipse), is a Canadian streamer, YouTuber, former professional Valorant player, and former professional Counter-Strike: Global Offensive player. , his Twitch channel has reached over 10 million followers, ranking as the eighth most-followed channel on the platform, and his YouTube channel has over 6.82 million subscribers.

Early life 
Grzesiek was born on June 2, 1994 in Toronto, Ontario, and is of Polish descent.

Career

Counter-Strike: Global Offensive
Grzesiek started his Counter-Strike: Global Offensive (CS:GO) career with several ESEA teams, particularly Exertus eSports and Manajuma. He was soon signed by compLexity Gaming as a stand-in, and later by Cloud9 in August 2014 when they acquired the roster of compLexity. He helped lead Cloud9 to a first-place finish at ESL Pro League Season 4 in 2016. He stepped down from the starting roster in 2017 to move to full-time streaming for Cloud9.

Streaming and content creation
On April 18, 2018, Grzesiek left Cloud9 and officially retired from professional CS:GO.

On March 10, 2019, Grzesiek reached 100,000 Twitch subscribers, gaining another 14,000 the next day, making his subscriber count more than double streamer with the second most at the time—TimTheTatman. He continued to stream full-time on Twitch until October 2019, when he announced his move from Twitch to Microsoft streaming platform Mixer. He would be broadcasting exclusively on Mixer, following the steps of fellow streamer Tyler "Ninja" Blevins, who announced a similar deal earlier that year.

On June 22, 2020, Microsoft announced that it would be shutting down Mixer and instead partner with Facebook Gaming. It was alleged that Grzesiek received an offer from Facebook that would have financially exceeded that of Mixer. Grzesiek declined the offer and received the remainder of the current contract payout.

On August 11, 2020, Grzesiek announced that he would return to stream exclusively on Twitch. His first stream back the following day peaked at over 516,000 concurrent viewers.

Valorant
On July 8, 2022, Grzesiek signed with Sentinels as a player for their Valorant team.

Awards and nominations

See also
 List of most-followed Twitch channels

References

External links
 
 

1994 births
Canadian esports players
Canadian YouTubers
Cloud9 (esports) players
CompLexity Gaming players
Counter-Strike players
Gaming YouTubers
Living people
Sportspeople from Toronto
Twitch (service) streamers
YouTube channels launched in 2014
Canadian people of Polish descent
The Game Awards winners
Streamer Award winners